Joe Lyons (born 16 October 1997) is an English professional rugby league footballer who plays as a  or  for the Widnes Vikings in the Betfred Championship.

Playing career
Widnes-born Joe began playing rugby with the local Moorfield club before eventually joining the Widnes Scholarship Programme at the age of 14, and progressing through the club’s Academy structure to captain the Under 19’s in 2017, while also taking the BTEC National Diploma in Sport course. ‘Joey’ paid tribute to the support of his family and the input of all the coaches he has worked with as he named his senior debut against Leeds Rhinos in the 2018 Qualifiers as his career highlight to date.

Widnes Vikings
With the further experience of 16 appearances for North Wales Crusaders, including his first senior try, in 2018 he now looks forward to claiming a regular starting place in the Vikings’ first team as they seek an immediate return to Super League. Away from rugby Joe is a keen supporter of Manchester United.

He made his début for Widnes against the Leeds Rhinos in 2018.

References

External links
Widnes Vikings profile
SL profile

1997 births
Living people
English rugby league players
North Wales Crusaders players
Rugby league halfbacks
Rugby league five-eighths
Rugby league players from Widnes
Widnes Vikings players